WAKS (96.5 FM) is a commercial radio station licensed to Akron, Ohio, known as "96.5 KISS-FM" and featuring a contemporary hit radio (CHR) format. Owned by iHeartMedia, WAKS's studios are located at the Six Six Eight Building in downtown Cleveland's Gateway District, and its transmitter resides in Brecksville; because of this, the station is recognized as a Cleveland radio station serving Greater Cleveland and much of surrounding Northeast Ohio. 

WAKS is the Cleveland affiliate for Elvis Duran and the Morning Show, On Air with Ryan Seacrest, and American Top 40. In addition to a standard analog transmission, WAKS broadcasts over two HD Radio channels, and is available online via iHeartRadio. WAKS-HD2, which airs a mainstream urban format, is also relayed over a low-power FM translator.

History

WCUE-FM

On March 12, 1958, WCUE (1150 AM) of Cuyahoga Falls, Ohio launched an FM sister station at 96.5 Megahertz, WCUE-FM.

WKDD (96.5 FM)

 By 1977, WCUE-FM – which at that time was broadcasting an AOR format – switched its format to a AC format and called it "Mellow Rock" and renamed their station call letters to WKDD short for "We're Kidding!", John Gorman then Program Director at Malrite's Cleveland flagship rock 40 superstation bird WMMS recalls competing with WKDD in the Akron and Canton radio markets in its earlier days: "... the station attempted to create a 'Mellow Rock' mascot... "  By the late 1980's WKDD unseated WMMS as the highest rated station in the Akron market, including both Summit and Portage counties. The two stations continued to struggle for ratings dominance well into the 1990's, but often as such one of the two claimed the number one position in the Birch ratings service while the other won Arbitron's top spot.

Both Dancin' Danny Wright and Michael "Matthew 'Matt' Patrick" Ryan were among the station's personalities.  In 1987, WKDD raised Ryan's salary; his was already the highest in the Akron market, nearly five times the average for all other personalities in the market.  Then in 1995 Ryan has decided attemptedly to leave for Cleveland station WLTF (now WHLK).  This drew a legal fight from WKDD, which claimed Patrick's contract prevented him from leaving for any station within 40 miles of WKDD.

2001 "frequency swap"

On July 3, 2001, WKDD was one of seven Northeast Ohio radio stations involved in a complex exchange between three radio companies.  Although generally reported as a "frequency swap", in reality these seven radio stations mostly traded callsigns along with their respective formats and staffs – all to facilitate the transfers of ownership of four of the seven stations.  As part of this complex exchange, Clear Channel Communications (which would become iHeartMedia on September 16, 2014) changed the WKDD format from hot adult contemporary (hot AC) to contemporary hit radio (CHR); rebranded the station using the KISS-FM brand; reassigned on and off-air personnel; and on July 23, 2001, changed the station callsign to WAKS.  In effect, this new WAKS licensed to Akron (96.5 FM) became the successor to the previous WAKS licensed to Lorain (104.9 FM).

96.5 KISS-FM
Since November 2001, WAKS has been an affiliate of the syndicated program American Top 40.

Current programming
Weekday programming includes Elvis Duran and the Morning Show in morning drive and On Air with Ryan Seacrest middays, both via Premiere Networks.  Local WAKS personality Krystle Elyse hosts the late morning and The Jeremiah Show airs on afternoon drive, after Jeremiah Widmer brought his show to KISS FM in May 2022. 

All other music shifts are either voice-tracked out-of-market specifically for WAKS or programmed via Premium Choice.  Weekend programming includes American Top 40.

WAKS-HD2

Urban contemporary accounts for all regular programming on the HD2 digital subchannel. Branded "Real 106.1", WAKS-HD2 also simulcasts over Solon translator W291BV (106.1 FM), which itself is owned by Educational Media Foundation but operated by iHeartMedia. All regular content, including station imaging, voice-over audio, music and on-air talent, either comes from the iHeartMedia mainstream urban national format via the Premium Choice network, or is voice-tracked out-of-market specifically for Real 106.1.

References

External links

1958 establishments in Ohio
Contemporary hit radio stations in the United States
IHeartMedia radio stations
Radio stations established in 1958
AKS